Gazin Rural District is a rural district (dehestan) in Raghiveh District, Haftkel County, Khuzestan Province, Iran. At the 2006 census, its population was 5,352, in 1,048 families within 31 villages.

References 

Rural Districts of Khuzestan Province
Haftkel County